The 1925 Muhlenberg Mules football team was an American football team that represented Muhlenberg College as an independent during the 1925 college football season. Led by first-year head coach Haps Benfer, Muhlenberg  finished the season with a record of 6–3–1.

Schedule

References

Muhlenberg
Muhlenberg Mules football seasons
Muhlenberg Mules football